Jose Carvalho (born 18 August 1988) is a Portuguese slalom canoeist who has competed since 2004. He finished 9th in the C1 event at the 2016 Summer Olympics in Rio de Janeiro.

References 

1988 births
Living people
Portuguese male canoeists
Canoeists at the 2016 Summer Olympics
Olympic canoeists of Portugal